A list of antiquarian societies.

An antiquarian society is a learned society or professional association for antiquarians, people who study history with particular attention to ancient artifacts, archaeological and historic sites, and/or historic archives and manuscripts.

United Kingdom

National societies 
Cambrian Archaeological Association, which covers Wales and the Marches of Wales. 
Council for British Archaeology or CBA
Royal Society of Antiquaries of Ireland
Society of Antiquaries of London
Society of Antiquaries of Scotland

Regional and local societies 
Cambridge Antiquarian Society
Carmarthenshire Antiquarian Society
Clifton Antiquarian Club
Lancashire and Cheshire Antiquarian Society
Orkney Antiquarian Society
Society of Antiquaries of Newcastle upon Tyne
Society for Lincolnshire History and Archaeology
Spalding Gentlemen's Society

United States

National societies 
American Antiquarian Society

Regional and local societies 
Plymouth Antiquarian Society

See also

 Text publication society

Historical societies
History-related lists
Archaeological organizations
Archaeological professional associations
Historical societies of the United Kingdom
Historical societies of the United States
Lists of professional associations